Comoliopsis is a genus of flowering plants belonging to the family Melastomataceae.

Its native range is Venezuela and Northern Brazil.

Species:

Comoliopsis coriacea 
Comoliopsis montana 
Comoliopsis neblinae

References

Melastomataceae
Melastomataceae genera